Intellectual Property Institute may refer to:

 Intellectual Property Institute (United Kingdom)

 Intellectual Property Institute, at the University of Richmond School of Law, Virginia, US
 International Intellectual Property Institute, Washington, D.C., US